Buck Peak may mean:

Buck Peak (Arizona), in the Cabeza Prieta Mountains
Buck Peak (Diablo Range), in San Benito County, California
Buck Peak (New Mexico), in the Magdalena Mountains
Buck Peak (Oregon), the highest point in Multnomah County, Oregon

See also
Buck Mountain (disambiguation)